Villa Victoria Academy is an all-girls, private, Catholic middle and high school located in the West Trenton section of Ewing Township, New Jersey. It is located in the Roman Catholic Diocese of Trenton. The school has been accredited by the Middle States Association of Colleges and Schools Commission on Elementary and Secondary Schools since 1996; Middle States accreditation of the school expires on January 1, 2029.

As of the 2017–18 school year, the school had an enrollment of 114 students and 31.6 classroom teachers (on an FTE basis), for a student–teacher ratio of 3.6:1. The school's student body was 62.3% (71) White, 14.9% (17) Black, 14.0% (16) Hispanic, 5.3% (6) Asian and 3.5% (4) two or more races.

History

Thomas Walsh, Bishop of Trenton, was able to acquire the  Fisk Estate in 1920, with the assistance of James Cox Brady. Villa Victoria was established in 1933 as a private academy by the Religious Teachers Filippini.

Athletics
Villa Victoria competes in interscholastic sports as part of the Penn-Jersey Athletic Association. Athletic programs offered to students include soccer, basketball, cross country, track, tennis, golf and softball.

Notable alumnae
 Amy Locane (born 1971), television and film actress who appeared in John Waters' 1990 musical comedy Cry-Baby and in the first season of the prime time soap opera Melrose Place.

See also
New Jersey Women's Hall of Fame Class of 2012 (Sr. Lillian Harrington, MPF, president)

References

External links
Villa Victoria Academy website
Data for Villa Victoria Academy, National Center for Education Statistics

1933 establishments in New Jersey
Educational institutions established in 1933
Ewing Township, New Jersey
Girls' schools in New Jersey
Middle States Commission on Secondary Schools
Private elementary schools in New Jersey
Private high schools in Mercer County, New Jersey
Private middle schools in New Jersey
Roman Catholic Diocese of Trenton
Catholic elementary schools in New Jersey
Catholic secondary schools in New Jersey